Playstos Entertainment is an Italian company that develops and publishes video games.

Their first product was Ruff Trigger: The Vanocore Conspiracy for PlayStation 2 (PS2) in 2006.

In addition, the company develops and publishes mobile apps and has a partnership with the computer graphics school UPGRADE.

On April 20, 2012, the company opened an 3D animation studio Inky Mind, focusing on 3D animation, TV and advertising production.

Videogames and Apps history 

 Ruff Trigger: The Vanocore Conspiracy (2006) (Publisher – Natsume) PS2
 Iridium Runners (2008) (publisher - SouthPeak Games) PS2
 Pallurikio (2009) iPhone iPad
 Cocktail Maker (2009) iPhone iPad
 Travel Mania! (2009) iPhone iPad
 Crazy Traffic (2009) iPhone iPad
 Cocktail Maker (2009) iPhone iPad
 Pallurikio (2010) PSP PSPgo PSVita PS3
 Crazy Traffic Crashed (2010) iPhone iPad
 Crazy Traffic Crashed XL (2010)  iPhone iPad
 Crazy Shodo (2011) iPhone iPad
 Crazy Shodo XL (2010) iPhone iPad
 This is Venice (2012) iPad
 Surround™ (2012) iPhone iPad
 Stay Dead (2012)  iPhone iPad
 Real World Racing (2013) PC

References for releases

External links 
 
Inky Mind

Video game development companies
Companies established in 2000
Video game companies of Italy
Software companies of Italy